A commercial mortgage broker acts as an intermediary who brokers mortgage loans on behalf of businesses or individuals who needs a commercial loan. The loan is provided by the commercial lender securing a commercial property of the borrower. In developed mortgage markets today like the United States, Canada, the United Kingdom, Australia, and United Arab Emirates, mortgage brokers are the largest sellers of mortgage products for lenders.

Some commercial mortgage brokers offer loans but most of them do not provide commercial mortgage loans. A commercial mortgage broker is often used to connect the borrower with potential lenders, obtain multiple quotes, and to manage the financing process.

Market competitiveness 
As markets for commercial mortgages have become more competitive, the role of the commercial mortgage broker has become more popular and a necessity. Because of this competitiveness, some lenders do not even consider applications made directly by borrowers; instead, they prefer applications made by brokers, as they know the whole process and market values and rates very well. A mortgage broker also helps customers make better choices about loans and lenders.

Fees 
There is no law or any official announced fees or commission for a commercial mortgage broker. Some brokers charge a fee to the lenders, and others take commission, which they receive from the lenders whom they introduce to borrowers.

By country

In Canada 
In Ontario, commercial mortgage brokers are not required to carry a license. This helps reduce the red tape for commercial borrowers to work with commercial mortgage brokers. The commercial borrowers do not require a layer of regulatory protection because they are large enough to protect themselves.

In the UK 
In the United Kingdom, commercial mortgage brokers are regulated by the National Association of Commercial Finance Brokers (NACFB).

In the US 
In the United States, commercial brokers are represented by a certificate of National Association of Mortgage Brokers (NAMB): Certified Mortgage Consultant (CMC).

See also 
 Commercial lender (U.S.)

References 

Brokerage firms
Mortgage